Adi Meyerson is an israeli jazz bassist. Based in New York City, her debut album, Where We Stand, was released in June 2018.

References

External links
 Official site

21st-century jazz composers
American double-bassists
Living people
Year of birth missing (living people)
21st-century double-bassists